"Love Is" is the debut single by Canadian singer/songwriter Alannah Myles, released in Canada in 1989. In the rest of the world (except Australia), it was released as the follow-up to her worldwide hit "Black Velvet" in 1990.

In 1990, the song was nominated for the Juno Award for Single of the Year, losing to Myles' own "Black Velvet".

Music video

Myles filmed two music videos, both directed by Canadian photographer and film director Deborah Samuel, one for the Canadian release and the other in 1990 for the international release.

The original 1989 video opens with a shot of Myles' legs while walking onstage and she then performs the song at a concert with her band.

The 1990 videoclip sees Myles and her band performing the song in a studio. That footage is intercut with black & white scenes of men and women flirting in a bar, and scenes of Myles horseback riding in a desert, followed by an ostrich and a kangaroo. The desert scenes were filmed in Joshua Tree National Park, California.

Release and reception

Released as a single in April 1989 in Canada, the song peaked at #16, in June of that year, establishing Myles as a chart force in that country. In June 1989, it was released in Australia, but did not enter the top 100 chart until November 1989, and did not reach its peak of #12 until April 1990, after "Black Velvet" was released there and had become a top 10 hit. In the rest of the world, the song was released as the next single after "Black Velvet" in mid-1990, and charted moderately well worldwide, but did not achieve the same level of success "Black Velvet" had. In the U.S., it peaked at #36 on the Billboard Hot 100, her second top 40 hit on the chart, therefore disqualifying her as the one-hit wonder she's usually perceived there, and entered the top 40 in Ireland, the Netherlands and Belgium.

Track listing
 CD maxi, 12" maxi
 "Love Is" – 3:36
 "Rock This Joint" – 4:00
 "Hurry Make Love" – 2:15

 7" single
 "Love Is" – 3:36
 "Rock This Joint" – 4:00

Charts and certifications

Weekly charts

Year-end charts

Certifications

References

1989 songs
1989 debut singles
1990 singles
Alannah Myles songs
Songs written by David Tyson
Songs written by Christopher Ward (songwriter)
Atlantic Records singles